Dávid Kornél (in English sometimes Kornel David, born October 22, 1971) is a Hungarian former professional basketball player. He is the only Hungarian to play in the NBA.

Early life
Dávid grew up with the Budapesti Honvéd juniors squad and made his debut with Budapest Honvéd during the 1987–88 season. He was signed for the 1988–89 by Malév SC and played there also the 1989–90 season. In the 1990–91 season, he went back to Budapesti Honvéd and played there until the 1993–94 championship. In 1994, Albacomp (Székesfehérvár) recruited Dávid and was his team up to the 1996–97 championship season.

NBA career
Dávid was signed by the Chicago Bulls on October 1, 1997 and waived on October 28. He then spent part of the 1997-98 season with the Rockford Lightning in the CBA but was released in December 1997. He later moved back to Hungary, and was signed for the remainder of the season by Albacomp Székesfehérvár, winning the 1997-98 Hungarian National Championship. He would also spend part of the next season with Albacomp Székesfehérvár.

On 21 January 1999, Dávid was signed as a free agent by Chicago Bulls and was waived in January 2000. A few days later, he signed to the first of two consecutive 10-day contracts with the Cleveland Cavaliers. He then moved back to Hungary on February and was signed for the remainder of the season by Albacomp Székesfehérvár. Again Dávid would bring accolades by leading the Albacomp Székesfehérvár to the 2000 Hungarian National Cup. Next, Dávid signed as free agent by Toronto Raptors on August 2000 and was then traded to Detroit Pistons in February 2001.

Dávid played 109 NBA games, starting 11, averaging 5.0 points and 2.8 rebounds per game. A retrospective short documentary about his NBA career entitled Kornél on Tour was produced in 2017.

Post-NBA career
He moved to France for the 2001-02 season, signed on November, by Strasbourg IG. Later, Dávid moved to BC Žalgiris of Lithuania for the 2002-03 season, and promptly captured the Lithuanian National Championship.

He went to Spain for the 2003-04 season, donning jersey number 18 for TAU Cerámica. Dávid played a decisive role in the team's first Final Four appearance. He averaged 10.3 points and 4.2 rebounds in the regular season, but his numbers went up to 14.5 points and 5.3 rebounds in the Top 16, helping Tau to reach the playoffs. In October 2010 he was appointed as the Director of International Scouting at the Phoenix Suns.

In December 2012, Dávid Kornél became the president of the Hungarian club Alba Fehérvár.

Personal
He is married to handball player Fruzsina Azari. Their son, Barnabás Dalton was born in July 2017.

Career statistics

Euroleague

|-
| style="text-align:left;"| 2002–03
| style="text-align:left;"| Žalgiris
| 13 || 13 || 33.0 || .532 || .1000 || .793 || 8.2 || 1.1 || .9 || .8 || 16.9 || 21.8
|-
| style="text-align:left;"| 2003–04
| style="text-align:left;"| TAU Cerámica
| 20 || 17 || 28.1 || .526 || .333 || .773 || 5.3 || 1.8 || 1.1 || .5 || 12.2 || 13.2
|-
| style="text-align:left;"| 2004–05
| style="text-align:left;"| TAU Cerámica
| 23 || 15 || 26.1 || .530 || .500 || .888 || 4.9 || 1.0 || .8 || .5 || 10.9 || 12.7
|-
| style="text-align:left;"| 2005–06
| style="text-align:left;"| TAU Cerámica
| 25 || 13 || 21.1 || .509 || .200 || .853 || 4.8 || .5 || 1.0 || .5 || 9.1 || 10.3

See also
 List of foreign NBA players

References

External links
Kornel David playerfile @ NBA.com
Kornel David NBA stats basketballreference.com
Kornel David bio/stats @ euroleague.net
Kornel David tows team to Final four

1971 births
Living people
People from Nagykanizsa
Sportspeople from Zala County
Alba Fehérvár players
CB Gran Canaria players
Chicago Bulls players
Cleveland Cavaliers players
Detroit Pistons players
Hungarian expatriate basketball people in Canada
Hungarian expatriate basketball people in France
Hungarian expatriate basketball people in Lithuania
Hungarian expatriate sportspeople in the United States
Hungarian men's basketball players
National Basketball Association players from Hungary
Liga ACB players
Power forwards (basketball)
Rockford Lightning players
Saski Baskonia players
SIG Basket players
Toronto Raptors players
Undrafted National Basketball Association players